Domene is a genus of rove beetles in the sub family Paederinae.

References 

 Fauvel, A. 1873. Faune Gallo-Rhénane ou description des insectes qui habitent la France, la Belgique, la Hollande, les provinces rhénanes et le Valais, avec tableaux synoptiques et planches gravées. (Suite). Bulletin de la Société Linnéenne de Normandie (2)6 (1872): 8–136, pls. 1–2. BHL [original description: p. 134]
 Fauvel, A. 1873. Faune Gallo-Rhénane ou description des insectes qui habitent la France, la Belgique, la Hollande, les provinces rhénanes et le Valais, avec tableaux synoptiques et planches gravées. (Suite). Bulletin de la Société Linnéenne de Normandie (2)7: 8–131. BHL [original description: p. 19]

External links 
 

Staphylinidae genera
Paederinae